CER6 may refer to:
 Aklavik Water Aerodrome